Lepidion is a genus of morid cods.

Species
The currently recognized species in this genus are:
 Lepidion capensis Gilchrist, 1922
 Lepidion ensiferus (Günther, 1887) (Patagonian codling)
 Lepidion eques (Günther, 1887) (North Atlantic codling)
 Lepidion guentheri (Giglioli, 1880)
 Lepidion inosimae (Günther, 1887) (morid cod)
 Lepidion lepidion (A. Risso, 1810) (Mediterranean codling)
 Lepidion microcephalus Cowper, 1956 (small-headed cod)
 Lepidion natalensis Gilchrist, 1922
 Lepidion schmidti Svetovidov (ru), 1936 (Schmidt's cod)

References

Moridae